A Man in Love or Man in Love may refer to:

Books
A Man in Love, novel by Karl Ove Knausgaard

Film and TV
A Man in Love (1987 film) (French: Un homme amoureux, Italian: Un uomo innamorato) 
Man in Love (2014 film) (2014 film) (남자가 사랑할 때; Namja-ga Saranghal Ddae)
When a Man Falls in Love (남자가 사랑할 때; Namja-ga Saranghal Ddae) 2013 South Korean television series

Music

Songs
 "A Man in Love", 1972 single by George Perkins (singer)
 "Man in Love", Eric Clapton 1983
"A Man In Love",	Dynasty (band)	1982
"A Man In Love",	Tommy Tucker (singer)	1959
"A Man In Need Of Love",	Sandy Posey	1971
"A Man Is In Love", The Waterboys	1991
 "Galjeung (A Man in Love)", Korean song by Super Junior